Rüttimann is a surname. Notable people with the surname include:

Anna Maria Rüttimann-Meyer von Schauensee (1772–1856), Swiss salonist
Johann Jakob Rüttimann (1813–1876), Swiss politician, President of the Swiss Council of States and President of the Federal Supreme Court
Niki Rüttimann (born 1962), Swiss cyclist
Toni Rüttimann (born 1967), Swiss bridge engineer
Vinzenz Rüttimann (1769–1844), Swiss politician